Hotel Cuba is a historic hotel building located at Cuba, Crawford County, Missouri. It was built in 1915, and is a one-story, rectangular, red brick building. A one-story addition was built in 1926. It has a front parapet roof and features a full width flat roof porch on the front façade.

It was listed on the National Register of Historic Places in 2014.

References

Hotel buildings on the National Register of Historic Places in Missouri
Hotel buildings completed in 1915
Buildings and structures in Crawford County, Missouri
National Register of Historic Places in Crawford County, Missouri